Proctocera lugubris is a species of beetle in the family Cerambycidae. It was described by James Thomson in 1858. It is known from Gabon and the Democratic Republic of the Congo.

References

Lamiinae
Beetles described in 1858
Taxa named by James Thomson